Bowers & Wilkins, commonly known as B&W, is a British company that produces consumer and professional loudspeakers and headphones.

B&W was founded in 1966 by John Bowers in Worthing, West Sussex, England.

In October 2020, B&W was acquired by Sound United, a holding company who owns several other audio brands.

Technology, research and development
Research and development has been a core activity within B&W, stimulated and exercised by its founder John Bowers (1922–1987). From the start of the company, earnings were invested in new product development.

In 1982 the company opened a dedicated, purpose-built research centre titled 'SRE' or 'Steyning Research Establishment' in Steyning, about 10 miles from Worthing. The buildings were fit for audio-related work since they were previously used by SME, the English tonearm designer who felt the downturn in tonearm sales due to the introduction of the new digital media CD. SRE housed a prototype shop and listening rooms, ranging from semi-anechoic to typical small living rooms. Also available was advanced equipment like a laser interferometer and PDP-11/35 computer.

The design of B&W loudspeaker cabinets has been done by industrial designer Kenneth Grange since 1975. Morten Villiers Warren became manager of design in the late 1990s when designing the new 800 series of speakers.

Noteworthy loudspeaker innovations by B&W:
The patented use of Kevlar fibres, impregnated with a stiffening resin, resulting in B&W's distinctive yellow speaker cones started in 1974.  This composite material proved to provide controlled rigidity and internal damping, minimising distortion, as Fryer determined by using laser interferometry on speaker cones.
Phase linear transmission was realised in the DM6 from 1976. In the DM6, the speakers are mounted in different vertical planes.
In 1977 the DM7 introduced a tweeter separate from the main speaker cabinet. This has been a feature of many B&W speaker designs since.
Engineer Laurence Dickie invented the 'Matrix' enclosure which reduces cabinet sound colouration. This bracing topology resembles a wine-case, providing multiple thin panel-braces, spaced throughout the enclosure, improving rigidity. This was in response to Celestion's SL6000 loudspeaker that was made with Aerolam cabinet walls. Dickie's response was to use the same concept but make it all the way through the cabinet rather than just the walls. Matrix has been used with great success by B&W ever since. 
The 'Nautilus' speaker resulted from research commenced by Bowers into 'perfect dipoles'. Before Bowers died, he handed this research to the young Dickie who discovered the principle of the exponential tapered tube. The Nautilus project was one of the most extensive research and development projects undertaken. Instead of open-backed drivers, it uses drivers loaded by reverse-tapered horns, or exponentially diminishing tubes, to absorb the rear radiation. The construction is based on fibre-reinforced plastic enclosures. The result of the distinct speaker shape was a near perfect response and near-zero enclosure colouration.
The 'Flowport' is an improvement that reduces friction in the air moving through the bass reflex vent. This is realised by covering the surface of the vent with dimples, just like a golf ball.
 The diamond tweeter was developed to create the optimal ratio of tweeter dome mass and material stiffness. The tweeter is grown into shape by chemical vapour deposition.

Formation
Released in 2019, the Formation Suite consists of Duo, Wedge, Bar, Bass, Audio and Flex.

History

Early years
Bowers & Wilkins began as a radio and electronics shop in Worthing. It was started after World War II by Bowers and Roy Wilkins who had met while serving in the Royal Corps of Signals during the war. The shop expanded to include televisions retail, a rentals business and a service department run by Peter Hayward. When the shop began supplying public address equipment to schools and churches in Sussex, Bowers became increasingly involved in the design and assembly of loudspeakers, eventually setting up a small production line in workshops behind the shop.

1960s
In 1966, Bowers started a separate business: B&W Loudspeakers Ltd., and was no longer involved with the shop itself. The first production line was established in the workshops in the shop's backyard. The shop still exists to this day, and the remnants of the original production line can still be seen.  The shop is now owned by and managed by Roy's son Paul Wilkins, who together with Chris Hugill used to run the UK distribution arm of B&W, B&W Loudspeakers UK Ltd. They also acted as the UK distribution of the aforementioned Aura range of electronics, and Nakamichi compact cassette decks.

The 1967 P1 was the first commercial speaker from B&W. The cabinet and filter were B&W's own, but the drivers came from EMI and Celestion. The profits of the P1 allowed Bowers to purchase a Radiometer Oscillator and Pen Recorder, allowing for calibration certificates for every speaker sold.

In 1968, Audioscript in the Netherlands became the first international distributor appointed. The DM1 (Domestic Monitor) and DM3 were introduced. Dennis Ward (a former technical manager at EMI) became a member of the board in 1969.

1970s
In 1970, the ionovac-tweeter equipped P2 speakers were produced.  They were also licensed by Sony and rebadged in Worthing to be distributed in Japan.

Bowers decided to develop a loudspeaker wholly built in-house. The sizeable DM70 from 1970 combined electrostatic mid- and high range on top of a traditional bass unit. The distinct shape of the loudspeaker won a British Industrial Design Award. Good press reviews made exports start to rise.

In 1972 a new production facility was opened in Meadow Road, Worthing. Housing anechoic chambers and extensive Bruel & Kjaer measurement equipment, the research team investigated phase linearity and speaker cone construction using laser interferometry.

1972 also saw the introduction of the DM2, a three unit system, consisting of an 8-inch bass/mid-range speaker rear loaded with an acoustic line, a Celestion HF1300 tweeter, and a super tweeter.

B&W received the Queen's Award for Export in 1973, and built programme content monitors for the BBC.

In 1974, Kenneth Grange of Pentagram was appointed as industrial designer.

The 1976 DM6 loudspeaker introduced Kevlar cones and phase linear filter and enclosure design. The Steyning research facility is opened and a PDP11/35 computer is acquired. The building was bought from SME Ltd, also based in Steyning.

The 1977 DM7 showed a tweeter separate from the main cabinet and a passive radiator.

After a tenfold increase in export since 1973, the second Queen's Award for Export is awarded in 1978.

The 801 loudspeaker, taking three years of development, was introduced in 1979.

1980s

Research into amplifiers and active filters leads to the Active One loudspeaker, branded under the name of John Bowers in 1984. Laurence Dickie was hired as an amplifier designer. Dickie was not employed as a Loudspeaker engineer but in his spare time
he developed the idea of a 'matrix' construction, after initial inspiration of Aerolam being used by Celestion. Dickie's reasoning was to extend the structure of Aerolam to fill the entire cabinet. He presented his ideas to John Bowers and it was tested by the research team and found to have significant qualities in reducing loudspeaker cabinet colouration. A new range with this 'Matrix' culminated into the first 'Matrix 1,2 and 3' loudspeakers, to much acclaim.

The 800 loudspeaker range was improved into matrix versions with its very rigid cabinet construction in 1987.

In December 1987 Bowers died. Robert Trunz took leadership of the company and asked Dickie to independently complete the work of John Bowers, who was researching a way of producing a speaker with zero cabinet effect. This ultimately became the 'Nautilus' Loudspeaker premiered in its prototype form in 1991.

Also in 1987, John Dibb joined the company, later to become responsible for many speaker designs, notably several signature models.

Dibb's 1987 'Concept 90' CM1 loudspeaker was the first B&W speaker with a plastic molded matrix cabinet.

1990s

Silver Signature loudspeaker was launched to commemorate the company's 25th anniversary as well as the introduction to 'Project Nautilus'.

Increasing demand led to by opening an additional production site at Silverdale, Worthing, West Sussex in 1992. In the mid 90s Joe Atkins took control of Bowers and Wilkins.

The 1993 'Nautilus' Loudspeaker was officially launched and still remains the company's flagship product. In 1998, Some of the Nautilus technology was introduced in the somewhat more affordable Nautilus 800 series.

2000s

In 2002 B&W moved its Worthing production, warehousing, and head office to a new £7 million location on a former landfill site in Dale Road, Worthing. A second plant was built in Bradford.

B&W took over its production factory for cabinets in Agerbæk, Denmark in 2003. In the same year, the Bradford location was left for new premises in Cleckheaton, West Yorkshire. 
In 2005, Bowers & Wilkins replaced its top-of-the-line N800 range with the new 800D range.  The most publicized change was the introduction of diamond dome tweeters on some models 2005 also saw B&W receive the Queen's Award for Innovation for the tube-loaded drivers on the 800s. The EISA Award for European High-End Audio Component of the Year is awarded to the 603.  The PV1 receives the European Home Theatre Subwoofer of the year 2005–2006 award. The XT series introduced aluminium as a speaker cabinet material.

In 2007 the 'Zeppelin' iPod speaker system was introduced.

In 2008, the "Jaguar XF Audio System" was introduced, a car audio setup with 14 speakers and a powered 440 Watt Class AB DSP amplifier.

Bowers & Wilkins' latest project is the Society of Sound. Launched in June 2007, it is an online community focused on issues and discussions relating to high-quality sound. The Society of Sound has many celebrity "Fellows", who contribute material. Fellows include Peter Gabriel, film composer James Howard, musician Dave Stewart, jazz singer Cassandra Wilson, and industrial designer Kenneth Grange.

In May 2008, Bowers and Wilkins started the Bowers & Wilkins Music Club, now known as the Society of Sound, returning the company into the music business. The Society of Sound is a subscription-based music retail site. Albums are currently available in either Apple Lossless or Flac format.  The site is a partnership with Peter Gabriel's Real World Studios, and artists to be featured have been Little Axe, Cara Dillon, Gwyneth Herbert, and Portico Quartet. Former Suede frontman Brett Anderson had his solo album Wilderness released through the Society of Sound before being available for retail.

2010s
In May 2016, Bowers & Wilkins was bought by Eva Automation, a company founded two years prior by Gideon Yu.

In October 2017 Bowers & Wilkins became the official headphones and loudspeaker partner of Abbey Road Studios.

2020s
In October 2020 Sound United LLC acquired Bowers & Wilkins.

Locations 
The headquarters for Bowers & Wilkins is in Worthing, West Sussex.

References

External links 
 Bowers & Wilkins Web Site
 History of Bowers & Wilkins
 

Loudspeaker manufacturers
Audio equipment manufacturers of the United Kingdom
British companies established in 1966
Companies based in Sussex
1966 establishments in England
British brands